Typhonium wilbertii is a species of plant in the arum family that is endemic to Australia.

Etymology
The specific epithet wilbertii honours Dutch botanist Wilbert Hetterscheid.

Description
The species is a deciduous, geophytic, perennial herb, which resprouts annually from a corm 3–4 cm in diameter. The greyish-green leaves are usually trilobed and 13–28 cm by 17–30 cm. The flower is enclosed in a green spathe about 13 cm long. The fruits are orange berries.

Distribution and habitat
The species occurs on the tropical Cape York Peninsula of Far North Queensland. It is found on the edges of notophyll rainforest on mudstone soils at elevations of 90–150 m.

References

 
wilbertii
Monocots of Australia
Flora of Queensland
Plants described in 1993
Taxa named by Alistair Hay